My.Games (styled as MY.GAMES) is a European publisher and developer headquartered in Amsterdam. Some of the company's titles include War Robots, Rush Royale, Hustle Castle, Left to Survive, Zero City, Warface GO and Tacticool.

History 
In 2016, the company acquired mobile developer Pixonic. In 2017, an investment division Mail.ru Games Ventures (MRGV) was set up as part of the company’s Gaming department. On May 30, 2019, Mail.ru Group consolidated all of its gaming assets under the united My.Games brand. In 2020 MRGV was renamed to My.Games Venture Capital (MGVC). In October 2020, My.Games became a major shareholder of Deus Craft and its current flagship product Grand Hotel Mania, released in July 2020. In September 2022, VK completed a multi-stage deal to sell 100% of MY.GAMES to Aleksander Chachava, the managing partner at LETA Capital.

In December 2022, My.Games announced it is pulling out of Russia. In an announcement issued by its Amsterdam headquarters, the publisher said all parts of the business that have been generating revenue in Russia will be spun off into a new independent entity and that this entity will have no affiliation with My.Games.

References 

Companies established in 2006
Video game publishers